Navoloki is a town in Kineshemsky District of Ivanovo Oblast, Russia, located on the right bank of the Volga River,  northeast of Ivanovo, the administrative center of the oblast. Population:

History
It was founded in the 1880s as a settlement for workers engaged in the construction of a textile factory. It was granted town status in 1938.

Administrative and municipal status
Within the framework of administrative divisions, Navoloki is subordinated to Kineshemsky District. Prior to the adoption of the Law #145-OZ On the Administrative-Territorial Division of Ivanovo Oblast in December 2010, it used to be incorporated separately as an administrative unit with the status equal to that of the districts.

As a municipal division, the town of Navoloki, together with eighteen rural localities in Kineshemsky District, is incorporated within Kineshemsky Municipal District as Navolokskoye Urban Settlement.

References

Notes

Sources

External links
Official website of Navoloki 
Mojgorod.ru. Entry on Navoloki 

Cities and towns in Ivanovo Oblast
Populated places on the Volga
Kineshemsky Uyezd